Puttanna is an Indian politician who served as Council Deputy Chairperson of Karnataka Legislative Council. He regained the position in 2014 after losing it to Vimala Gowda in 2011.

Personal life 
He was born on 22 April 1966 in Kadankanahalli. He is a postgraduate in history.

References 

1966 births
Living people
Indian politicians
Members of the Karnataka Legislative Council
Karnataka MLCs 2014–2020
Deputy Chairpersons of Karnataka Legislative Council